Stormyrbassenget, also known as Stormyraven or Avan, is a lake in the municipality of Hemnes in Nordland county, Norway. The lake lies along the river Røssåga as it flows north to the Ranfjord.

See also
 List of lakes in Norway
 Geography of Norway

References

Hemnes
Lakes of Nordland